Gustavo Sant'Ana Santos (born 23 February 1995), commonly known as Gustavo, is a Brazilian footballer who currently plays as a defender for Đông Á Thanh Hóa.

Club career

Đông Á Thanh Hóa
On 21 July 2022, Gustavo joined Đông Á Thanh Hóa for half-season of 2022 V-league 1.

Career statistics

Club

Notes

Achievements

Club
Đông Á Thanh Hóa
Vietnamese National Cup:
 Third place : 2022

References

1995 births
Living people
Brazilian footballers
Brazilian expatriate footballers
Association football defenders
Viettel FC players
V.League 1 players
Brazilian expatriate sportspeople in Vietnam
Expatriate footballers in Vietnam
Footballers from São Paulo